{{Taxobox
| name = Thermodesulforhabdus
| domain = Bacteria
| phylum = Thermodesulfobacteriota
| classis = Syntrophobacteria
| ordo = Syntrophobacterales
| familia = Thermodesulforhabdaceae
| familia_authority = Waite et al. 2020
| genus = Thermosulforhabdus
| genus_authority = Beeder et al. 1996
| type_species = Thermodesulforhabdus norvegica 
| subdivision_ranks = Species
| subdivision = T. norvegica}}Thermodesulforhabdus'' is an acetate-oxidizing bacterial genus from the order Syntrophobacterales. Up to now there is only on species of this genus known (Thermodesulforhabdus norvegica).

References

Thermodesulfobacteriota
Monotypic bacteria genera
Bacteria genera